When Death Comes is the fifth studio album by Danish thrash metal band Artillery. It was released in 2009 via Metal Mind Productions. It is their first recording since their second breakup from 2000 to 2007, and their first full-length studio album since B.A.C.K., which was released ten years earlier.

Track listing

Bonus tracks

Personnel 
Søren Adamsen – vocals
Morten Stützer – guitars
Michael Stützer – guitars
Peter Thorslund – bass
Carsten Nielsen – drums

References

2009 albums
Artillery (band) albums
Metal Mind Productions albums